Isitt is an English surname. It may refer to: 

Debbie Isitt, English director and writer
Frank Isitt (1843–1916), New Zealand Methodist minister
Kate Isitt (journalist) (1876–1948), New Zealand journalist and writer
Kate Isitt, English actress
Leonard Isitt (minister) (1855–1937), New Zealand Methodist minister and politician
Sir Leonard Isitt (aviator) (1891–1976), New Zealand military aviator and administrator